Dimitrie Maimarolu (1859 in Bucharest – 1926) was a Romanian architect, whose designs featured French Beaux-Arts style.

He came from an Aromanian family, with roots in Macedonia. He studied architecture in France, first with Julien Guadet and from 1881 at the École des Beaux-Arts in Paris. After graduating in 1885, he returned to Romania and is named architect for the Interior Ministry. Promoted to architect-in-chief in 1887, he held the position until 1892. By 1898 he was working for the Agriculture Ministry, developing the Bibescu Garden in Craiova.

Among the buildings he designed are:
 Argeș County Prefecture Building (built in 1899, in 1970 it became the County Museum of History and Natural Science).
Gorj County Prefecture, in Târgu Jiu (finishing touches, 1902).
 Church of St. Sylvester, Bucharest (reconstruction and enlargement, from 1904 to 1907).
 St. Haralambos Church of Turnu Măgurele (1905)
 Palace of the Chamber of Deputies (the Patriarchal Palace today), completed in 1907
 Palace of the National Military Circle, begun in 1911, completed in 1923.
 Armenian Church in Bucharest, 1911–1912, with Grigore Cerchez
 Hotel Concordia.
 Vorvorenilor's Home (Palace) in Craiova (present residence of the Metropolitan of Oltenia)

Legacy
On 1 March 2005, a bust of Maimarolu was unveiled within the National Military Circle Palace.

Notes 

1859 births
1926 deaths
Architects from Bucharest
École des Beaux-Arts alumni